Kouat Noi (born 29 October 1997) is a South Sudanese-Australian professional basketball player for the Sydney Kings of the Australian National Basketball League (NBL).

Early life 
Noi was born in Khartoum, Sudan during the height of the Second Sudanese Civil War.  His family fled the country amid escalations of the conflict, first to Egypt and later to Australia in 2002. Growing up in Newcastle, he blossomed into a basketball star, and went on to average 9.1 points and 4.3 rebounds while helping lead Australia to a silver medal at the 2014 FIBA Under-17 World Championship in Dubai.

Noi attended St Francis Xavier's College in Newcastle. In 2014, Noi moved to the United States and enrolled at Montverde Academy in Montverde, Florida, where he briefly played alongside Ben Simmons.  As a senior in the 2015–16 season, Noi averaged more than 19 points per game for the Eagles.

College career 
Noi enrolled at Texas Christian University (TCU) on a basketball scholarship in the summer of 2016, and redshirted in his first season on campus as the Horned Frogs won the 2017 NIT title under first-year head coach Jamie Dixon.

In 2017–18, Noi played in all 33 of TCU's games, starting nine of them.  He averaged 10.2 points per game as the Frogs finished the season with a 21-12 record and secured a berth in the 2018 NCAA tournament, the program's first in 20 years.

As a sophomore, Noi registered his first collegiate 20-point game with a 27-point performance against Eastern Michigan on 26 November 2018 and his first career 30-point game against Oklahoma on 12 January 2019. Noi averaged 13.9 points and 4.9 rebounds per game as a sophomore playing in 31 games, including 19 starts. He declared for the 2019 NBA draft, forfeiting his remaining two years of eligibility. He later withdrew from the draft.

Professional career

Cairns Taipans (2019–2022) 
In July 2019, Noi signed with the Cairns Taipans of the Australian National Basketball League. In March 2021, he suffered a PCL injury that ruled him out for 12 weeks.

In June 2021, Noi signed a two-season contract with the club (the second year being a mutual option).

Following the 2021–22 NBL season, Noi joined the USC Rip City in the NBL1 North, where he earned All-Star Five honours.

Sydney Kings (2022–present) 
In June 2022, Noi signed a two-season contract with the Sydney Kings (the second year being a mutual option).

Personal life
Noi was born in Sudan but considers himself as South Sudanese. His father, Ater Dhiu, played basketball for the Sudan men's national basketball team.

References

External links 
TCU Horned Frogs bio

1997 births
Living people
Australian expatriate basketball people in the United States
Australian men's basketball players
Cairns Taipans players
Forwards (basketball)
Montverde Academy alumni
People from Khartoum
South Sudanese emigrants to Australia
South Sudanese expatriate basketball people in the United States
South Sudanese men's basketball players
Sydney Kings players
TCU Horned Frogs men's basketball players
South Sudanese refugees
Refugees in Egypt
Sportsmen from New South Wales
Sportspeople from Newcastle, New South Wales
Sudanese people of South Sudanese descent